The Hidden Hand may refer to:

 The Hidden Hand (1942 film), a comedy horror film
 The Hidden Hand (band), a stoner/doom band from Maryland
 The Hidden Hand (novel), a serial novel by E. D. E. N. Southworth
 The Hidden Hand (serial), a 1917 American film serial
 The Hidden Hand: Middle East Fears of Conspiracy